What's Your Number? is the second extended play by Chinese singer Zhoumi, released by Label SJ, SM Entertainment and distributed KT Music on July 19, 2016.

Background and release 
On July 12, SM Entertainment released teaser video for track Empty Room (Chinese Ver.). On July 14, The music video for Empty Room (Chinese Ver.) was released. In the same day, Zhoumi was announced to be releasing his second extended play title What's Your Number? on July 19.

However, both music videos received high rate of dislikes due to Zhou Mi's political involvement.

Promotion 
Zhoumi began performing "What's Your Number?" on South Korean music television programs on July 19, 2016.

Track listing

Release history

References

SM Entertainment EPs
Korean-language EPs
Chinese-language EPs
2016 EPs